Roxane Forget (born 17 January 1972) is a Canadian taekwondo practitioner. 

She won a silver medal in bantamweight at the 1997 World Taekwondo Championships in Hong Kong, after being defeated by Hwang Eun-suk in the final. She won a gold medal at the 1999 Pan American Games in Winnipeg.

References

External links

1972 births
Living people
Canadian female taekwondo practitioners
Pan American Games medalists in taekwondo
World Taekwondo Championships medalists
Pan American Games gold medalists for Canada
Pan American Games silver medalists for Canada
Taekwondo practitioners at the 1995 Pan American Games
Taekwondo practitioners at the 1999 Pan American Games
Pan American Taekwondo Championships medalists
Medalists at the 1995 Pan American Games
Medalists at the 1999 Pan American Games
20th-century Canadian women